Wang Liping, Daoist name WANG Yong-sheng, 法号"灵灵子", means "Lone Daoist". Born in June 1949 at the Mountain foot of Liaoning Province Fushun City, he is the 18th generation transmitter of the Dragon Gate Taoism branch of Quanzhen School.

Introduction
Wang Liping was taught and trained by three Daoist hermits—Zhang HeDao (Wu-Ji Daoist) who was the 16th generation transmitter, as well as Wang JiaoMing (Yin-Ling Daoist) and Jia Jiaoyi (Song-Ling Daoist) who are 17th generation of Dragon Gate branch from Mount Lao of Shandong Province. Wang Liping currently lives in Mainland China.

Wang Liping has been known as a Modern Taoist Wizard by the book of Opening the Dragon Gate: The Making of a Modern Taoist Wizard translated by Thomas Cleary. This book was originally written in Chinese and titled Da-Dao-Xing (Opening Dragongate), which describes the process of his training.

Wang explained traditional Daoist training techniques to modern people by using contemporary languages. Master Wang publicly teaches people parts of Ling Bao Bi Fa, which is a book about internal alchemy arts written by Zhongli Quan in the Han Dynasty. The art of Master Wang's teaching was known as "Internal alchemy of Ling Bao Intelligence Enlightenment". The authors of "Xing-Da-Dao (Entering Dragongate)" claim that their work captures Mr. Wang Liping's public teaching during his early years.

Recently, Wang began to openly teach his Taoist "Inner alchemy" secret to domestic and international students (Please see this link for an article titled "Wang Liping Teaching Openly - Why is this important ? "). It was claimed that Wang thought the thousand year old long lasting of Taoist health teaching were best kept secret and did not clearly indicate the key points, this way is not fair for the modern students.

Media reports
 Chinese pre-leader Jiang Zemin had recommended Master Wang Liping to Russian pre-president Boris Yeltsin for disease treatment. [1]
 Internal alchemy at Lou Guan Temple in 1998. [6]
 Internal alchemy at Yu Chan Temple in 2007.  [7]
 Europeans were trained by Wang for Internal alchemy practicing based on <the Secret of the Golden Flower > in 2007, the report was published in 《contemporary Academic Research 》 [8].
 Internal alchemy seminar at Jinhua Immortal Huang birth Palace of Zhejiang province in 2008 [9].
 In 2009, Master Wang Liping was invited to have public teaching in the 1st Taoism Health and Culture Summer Camp at Jinhua city of Zhejiang province [10].
 From 2008 to 2011, Wang was invited to have seminar in Russia and Europe countries (http://dao.tjq.ru). The events are highly welcomed by the local people. These events make the Chinese traditional Taoism contributing to the global cultural exchanges.
 In 2009, Master Wang Liping teaching a study group of eleven students from the San Francisco Bay Area, New York, Switzerland and Israel went to a hot spring holiday resort place near Dalian city of China.(http://www.laoziacademy.us/2009_anbo.htm)[11].
 In April 2011, Master Wang Liping taught a study group of 14 foreign students from Northern America, Southern America, Europe, Africa, South Asia, etc. in China.(http://laoziacademy.us/2011_april.html)[12].

External links
 Laozi Academy 老子学院 - 501C(3) IRS (Internal Revenue Service) non-profit Organization (Chinese) (English)
 Moscow Chinese Newspaper "Chinese Doctor Changes Boris Yeltsin Younger "
 "Xue Tao evaluates contemporary QiGong"
 Da Dao Xing, written by Chen KaiGuo, Zheng ShunChao
 Opening the Dragon Gate: The Making of a Modern Taois, translated by Thomas Cleary Turttle Publisher 
 Xing Da Dao, written by Liu Yapi, Shen Zhigang 
 Internal alchemy class at Lou Guan Temple of Shanxi Province
 Yu Chan Temple Bulletin "Internal alchemy class"
  Contemporary Academic Research, page 24, Jan. 2008, written by Tingjun Wang, "Study of 'the Secret of Golden Flower' Internal alchemy practise"
 Internal alchemy seminar at Jinhua
 Media report of the 1st Taoism Health and Culture Summer Camp in Jinhua.

People's Republic of China Taoists
1949 births
Living people